Sperm surface protein Sp17 is a protein that in humans is encoded by the SPA17 gene.

This gene encodes a protein present at the cell surface. Studies in rabbits suggest that in sperm the protein is involved in fertilization by binding to the zona pellucida of the oocyte. Other studies in rabbits suggest that it is also involved in additional cell-cell adhesion functions such as immune cell migration and metastasis.

References

Further reading